Luigi Pappacoda (20 September 1595 – 17 December 1670) was a Roman Catholic prelate who served as the Bishop of Lecce (1639–1670) and the Bishop of Capaccio (1635–1639).

Biography
Luigi Pappacoda was born in Pisciotta, Italy on 20 September 1595.
On 12 February 1635, he was appointed during the papacy of Pope Urban VIII as Bishop of Capaccio.
On 18 February 1635, he was consecrated bishop by Francesco Maria Brancaccio, Cardinal-Priest of Santi XII Apostoli, with Carlo Carafa, Bishop of Aversa, and Pier Luigi Carafa, Bishop of Tricarico, serving as co-consecrators. 
On 30 May 1639, he was appointed during the papacy of Pope Urban VIII as Bishop of Lecce.
He served as Bishop of Lecce until his death on 17 December 1670.

While bishop, he was the principal co-consecrator of Camillo Ragona, Bishop of Acerno (1644).

References

External links and additional sources
 (for Chronology of Bishops) 
 (for Chronology of Bishops) 
 (for Chronology of Bishops) 
 (for Chronology of Bishops) 

17th-century Italian Roman Catholic bishops
Bishops appointed by Pope Urban VIII
1595 births
1670 deaths